Living Dub Volume 4 is an album by the Jamaican reggae musician Burning Spear, released in 1999.

Critical reception
The New Zealand Herald thought that "while being generally good smoky stuff, it doesn't bear comparison with his crucial Marcus Garvey/Garvey's Ghost and Social Living/Living Dub pairings from way back which drop your unsuspecting brain down an elevator shaft." 

AllMusic wrote that "it's not exactly easy listening, but to those with ears to hear, Burning Spear makes some of the most compelling reggae there is."

Track listing
Dub It Clean
Dub Appointment
First Time Dub
Physician Dub
Jah Dub
Dub Smart
Peaceful Dub
Dub African
My Island Dub
Music Dub
Loving Dub

Credits
All songs written and arranged by Winston Rodney.
Published by Burning Music Publishing, ASCAP.
Executive Producer: Sonia Rodney
Recorded at Grove Recording Studio, Ocho Rios, St. Ann's, Jamaica
Edited by Barry O'Hare
Mixed by Barry O'Hare and Winston Rodney.
Assistant engineer: Bobby Hawthorne
Mastered by Toby Mountain at Northeastern Digital Recording, Southborough, Mass.
Photography and back cover art © Dana Siles 1997
Cover photo-montage by Francisco Gonzalez.
Design by Jean-Pierre LeGuillou.
Album supervision by Chris Wilson.

Musicians
Winston Rodney - vocals, congas, percussion, background vocals
Nelson Miller - drums
James Smith - trumpet
Lenval Jarrett - rhythm guitar
Num H.S. Amun'Tehu - percussion, background vocals
Steven Stewart - keyboards
Rupert Bent - lead guitar
Ronald "Nambo" Robinson - trombone
Howard Messam - saxophone
Barry O'Hare - keyboard
Carol "Passion" Nelson - background vocals
Edna Rodney - background vocals
Rachell Bradshaw - background vocals
Yvonne Patrick - background vocals
Sharon Gordon - background vocals

Additional musicians
Tony Williams - drums
Trevor McKenzie - bass
Collin Elliot - bass
Robbie Lyn - keyboard, background vocals
Beezy Coleman - rhythm, lead guitar ("Play Jerry")
Junior "Chico" Chin - trumpet ("Play Jerry")
Uziah "Sticky" Thompson - percussion ("Play Jerry")
Tony Green - saxophone ("Play Jerry")

References

External links
 Burning Spear website

Burning Spear albums
1999 albums
Dub albums